The Story and the Song is the first album from Orlando-based rock band Between the Trees and debuted on September 19, 2006. The band dedicated "A Time For Yohe" and "The Way She Feels" to Renee Yohe, a recovered addict who inspired the creation of To Write Love on Her Arms.

Release
In conjunction with David McKenna of Bonded Records, the September 18, 2006 album release proved tremendously successful. A subsequent distribution contract with Universal Fontana further increased the album's popularity.

Track listing
 "The Forward"  - 3:37
 "White Lines & Red Lights"  - 3:53
 "The Way She Feels" - 3:44
 "Words" - 3:46
 "The Greatest of These (A Little Love)" - 3:53
 "Darlin'" - 4:31
 "A Time for Yohe" - 4:01
 "She Is..." - 4:46
 "Fairweather" - 3:25
 "The Fort" - 4:12
 "You Cry a Tear to Start a River" - 5:35

Footnotes

2006 debut albums
Between the Trees albums